Gymnastics at the 2011 European Youth Summer Olympic Festival (EYOF) was held from 25 to 29 July 2011. The competitions took place at the Yomra Arena in Trabzon, Turkey. At most three boys born 1994/1995 and girls born 1996/1997 or later from each country participated at the following 7 disciplines for boys and 6 for girls.

Medal summary

Medal table

Overall

Boys

Girls

Medal events

Boys

Girls

See also
 European Youth Olympic Festival

References

European Youth Summer Olympic Festival
2011 European Youth Summer Olympic Festival
Gymnastics competitions in Turkey
2011